The 2006 Atlantic 10 Conference Baseball Championship was held from May 24 through 28 at Jim Houlihan Park at Jack Coffey Field in The Bronx, NY. It featured the top six regular-season finishers of the conference's 14 teams. Fifth-seeded Saint Louis defeated St. Bonaventure in the title game to win the tournament for the first time, earning the Atlantic 10's automatic bid to the 2006 NCAA Tournament.

Seeding and format 
The league's top six teams, based on winning percentage in the 27-game regular-season schedule, were seeded one through six. The top two seeds, Rhode Island and St. Bonaventure, received byes into the second round of play in the double elimination tournament.

Bracket

All-Tournament Team 
The following players were named to the All-Tournament Team. Saint Louis pitcher Ryan Bird, one of two Billikens selected, was named Most Outstanding Player.

George Washington's Josh Wilkie (2005) and St. Bonaventure's Joe Rizzo (2004) were second-time selections.

Notes 

 The George Washington-Rhode Island 17 inning game was the longest in tournament history

References 

Tournament
Atlantic 10 Conference Baseball Tournament
Atlantic 10 Conference baseball tournament
Atlantic 10 Conference baseball tournament
2000s in the Bronx
Baseball in New York City
College sports in New York City
Sports competitions in New York City
Sports in the Bronx